Petter Northug Jr. (born 6 January 1986) is a Norwegian former cross-country skier and double Olympic champion. He won a total of 13 World Championship and two Winter Olympic gold medals with 20 medals overall (two gold, one silver and one bronze at the Olympics, 13 gold and three silver at the World Ski Championships), and 18 individual FIS Cross-Country World Cup wins with 13 podium places. He is also the record holder for most stage wins (13) in Tour de Ski. By winning his ninth gold medal in the Nordic World Ski Championships in 4 × 10 km relay in Val di Fiemme 2013 he leveled the achievement of Bjørn Dæhlie who had been the most successful World Champion male skier up to that point. He is considered by many as the greatest cross country skier of all time.

He is expected to work as a commentator of skiing, on channel TV 2 during the winter of 2021/2022.

Early life and career
During his early years, Northug was generally considered a star of the future. Whilst he was still a junior Verdens Gang newspaper reported in November 2005 that "the ski manufacturers are fighting to get Northug". Fischer won his signature, and his contract included a base salary (the first time ever for a junior), which would be multiplied by five if he made the Norwegian elite team for 2006/07, a goal in which he was successful. The contract also offered bonuses if he won medals in the junior World Championships.

Northug has six gold medals from junior World Championships. His first two gold medals came in 2004/05 in the pursuit and the 10 km freestyle in Rovaniemi, then in 2005/06 in Kranj he won gold in the 10 km classic, the pursuit, the sprint, and the relay. He also has two silver medals (one in the sprint, and one in the relay, both in 2004/05). His victories made him the first athlete ever to win five individual gold medals at the FIS Junior Nordic World Ski Championships. During 2005/06 he also took part in the Norwegian National Championships, and won the double pursuit race, beating Frode Estil by 1.9 seconds, and became the first junior to ever win a Norwegian National Championship.

Before he joined the World Cup he competed in a few Continental Cup meetings, but mostly in the Scandinavian Cup. During his Scandinavian Cup career (2004/05 & 2005/06) he had seven podium finishes, he came second once in 2004/05, and in 2005/06 he scored four victories, and two second places.

Skiing career
The 2005/06 season was Northug's first in the World Cup, although he competed in one race the season before, a sprint in Drammen, he came 35th. During the 2005/06 season he shared his time equally between the World Cup and the Scandinavian Cup, although in early May 2006 it was announced that Northug would be in the senior national team for the 2006/07 season. Northug also claimed his first World Cup victory in the 2005/06 season, in a pursuit race in Falun, beating 2005/06 World Cup winner Tobias Angerer, who came second, and 2004/05 overall champion Axel Teichmann was third. Then in the last race of the year, a pursuit in Sapporo he claimed another podium place, coming second. He lost to Mathias Fredriksson by 3.8 seconds. He also came seventh, tenth, and twelfth in sprint races, and fifteenth in the 50 km freestyle in Holmenkollen. Northug finished the 2005/06 World Cup season in 14th place overall. He also finished 14th in the distance standings, and 24th in the sprint.

After Norway's disappointing display at the 2006 Winter Olympics, the Norwegian press questioned why Northug was not taken to the Games. Northug himself admitted he was disappointed after not getting selected, especially as he had won the double pursuit in the National Championships earlier in the year. The day after the 2006 Olympics Team was announced, Northug was on the team winning the Norwegian Championships in 3x10 kilometer relay. As he crossed the finish line, he shouted "And I am not going to the Olympics?".

Northug won his first gold medal at the FIS Nordic World Ski Championships in Sapporo as a member of the 4 x 10 km relay in 2007. Northug completed the last leg of the relay, beating Sweden and Russia on the sprint for the finish line. He was also in a good position to compete for the silver in the 30 kilometer duathlon, but he fell in the last part of the race and was disappointed to finish fifth.

He was far more successful at the FIS Nordic World Ski Championships 2009 in Liberec, where he earned three golds in the 15 km + 15 km double pursuit, 4 x 10 km relay and 50 km freestyle mass start. In all three events he sprinted away from the rest of the pack to win the race.

Northug was the runner up to the overall World Cup in the 2008/2009 season, losing to the Swiss Dario Cologna after leading before the final races.

Northug finished in an extremely disappointing 41st place in the first Cross Country event during the 2010 Winter Olympics in Vancouver, British Columbia, Canada. A day later, Northug responded with a bronze medal in the Sprint Event. This success was short-lived however, as he broke his pole in the end of the 30 km pursuit, where he was one of the biggest favourites to win. He then won his first Olympic gold, in the Team Sprint, alongside Øystein Pettersen.

Days later he was skiing the anchor leg in the 4 x 10 km relay. When he took over from Lars Berger who was skiing the 3rd leg, he was 37.5 seconds behind the lead group. Despite this he managed to catch and overtake France and the Czech Republic to win Norway a silver medal. Northug then won his first individual medal at the Olympics when he won gold at the Men's 50 kilometre classic. Less than two weeks later, he won the 50 kilometre freestyle event at the Holmenkollen, becoming the first skier to win the 50 km at the Winter Olympics, World Championships, and Holmenkollen since Sweden's Gunde Svan reached that triple crown in 1988.

In September 2010 details of Northug's sponsorship contract with soft drink manufacturer Red Bull were publicized by Norwegian broadcaster TV 2, which did not divulge its sources, revealing the most profitable sponsorship agreement with an individual athlete in Norwegian history. For four years, until after the 2014 Winter Olympics, Northug was slated to receive a minimum of NOK 1 million annually with a prospect of getting twice that amount if his performances equalled those of his recent previous seasons.

Northug did not start the 2010–2011 season well, missing the first three weeks of the World Cup due to illness. His Tour de Ski campaign was also marred by relatively poor results in the opening stages. However, he climbed the rankings and finished 2nd after winning the prestigious penultimate stage (20 km classic mass start) in Val di Fiemme. In doing so, he also took all the intermediate bonus sprints, which had never previously been done by the winner of the race. In the Holmenkollen World Ski Championship Northug raced in five disciplines, taking 3 gold and 2 silver medals. During the 2011 World Championship, he gained widespread international attention when he controversially crossed the finish-line sideways after decisively beating his opponents on the last leg of the 4x10 kilometre relay. The gesture was regarded by media as disrespectful, most notably towards his most fierce rival, Marcus Hellner. At the end of the season Northug also won the Season Finale in Sweden, beating his compatriot Finn Haagen Krogh.

In the FIS Nordic World Ski Championships 2013, Northug won the 15 km freestyle for the first time at a World Championships, completing his collection of World Championship gold medals. He again beat the Swedes on the sprint of the 4x10 km relay, securing Norway's 7th World Championship gold medal in a row in the relay. Northug also won a silver in the individual sprint. He was less successful on the team sprint, where he and his teammate, Pål Golberg, went out in the semifinal. Despite being a favorite before the 50 km, Northug finished 21st. He gave the winner, Johan Olsson, his jersey after the race as a gesture of respect.

Northug had an impressive ending to the 2012–13 season. He won the 15 km individual classic in Lahti by over half a minute before being victorious in the famous classic sprint in Drammen. In the Season Finale in Sweden, Northug won first two stages, the prestigious classic sprint in Stockholm and freestyle prologue in Falun, then finished fourth in the penultimate stage, 15k classic mass start, and closed the season by winning the whole mini-tour. Before Lahti, Northug was in the third place in the World Cup, 226 points behind the lead; by the time it finished, he stood in first, 180 points ahead of second place.

The 2013-14 season saw Northug struggle with an illness which severely impacted his performance. Particularly frustrating for him was his inability to fight for medals in the skiathlon and individual sprint of the Sochi Olympics. His relatively lackluster performance in the 50 km event, which saw him finish a distant 18th in a race he had definitively won four years earlier, meant he left a major world event without a single medal for the first time in eight years.

Northug looked to be in better physical shape in the 2014/2015 season, and proved to be Sundby's strongest competition during that season's Tour de Ski. Despite leading before the final climb up the Alpe Cermis, he lost to Sundby, who won his second TdS title in a row. In July 2016, Sundby lost that title to Northug after Sundby's anti-doping rule violation, thereby giving Northug his first Tour de Ski win.

At the 2015 World Championships in Falun, Northug secured his 10th WC gold medal by narrowly beating Canada's Alex Harvey in a bunch sprint to the finish line in the men's classic sprint event. He then proceeded to contribute to Norway's victory in both the team sprint and 4x10km relay. The final race of these World Championships, i.e. the 50 km classic, saw Northug notch a notable victory. The race was held in difficult conditions due to heavy snowfall; sitting at third in the last climb before the finish, Northug, in a remarkable display of double poling, managed to overtake his remaining two opponents to win the race. As of 2015, Northug  had won 20 Olympic and World Championship medals (15 gold, 4 silver, 1 bronze).

He announced his retirement from cross-country skiing on 12 December 2018.

Career after competitive skiing

As late as 13 August 2020 he was doing occasional work as a celebrity at summer camp for teenage skiers.

In August 2020 Uno-X said that their sponsorship deal with Northug would be canceled in the near future, due to [the company's view that] Northug "must concentrate about other things".

In November 2020 he released a Christmas song, "Petters Jul".

Personal life
He has two brothers, Even and Tomas. Tomas Northug also skis professionally and won the Junior World Championships in sprint in 2010. Northug finished school in 2006, but during the summer of 2005 he changed schools from Steinkjer to Meråker and moved into a cabin next to the ski trails to optimize his training conditions.

Northug is an active poker player, and has openly supported the legalization of poker in Norway, which is currently illegal when prizes are involved under Norwegian gambling laws. He participated and cashed (on 653rd place) in the 2010 World Series of Poker main event which he played with skiing rival Marcus Hellner.

Northug is featured in the music video "Rise Again" by Jack Taylor, featuring Mo of Norway.

Substance abuse and traffic violations
In the early hours of 4 May 2014, Northug crashed his car, an Audi A7, near his home in Byåsen, Trondheim, while driving under the influence (DUI) of alcohol. A 23-year-old male passenger broke his collar bone in the crash. After the crash, Northug fled the scene, but was located at his nearby residence by the police using search dogs. In a press release made later the day of the crash, Northug apologised for the incident.

On 15 September 2014, Northug was charged by the Norwegian public prosecutor with five counts of violation of the Norwegian Road Traffic Act and one count of violation of the general civil penal code. The latter charge stemmed from Northug having claimed, in three separate police interrogations on the day of the crash, that his passenger had actually been driving the vehicle at the time of the accident. Due to Northug's initial claims, the passenger had been preliminarily charged with causing the incident.

Because Northug pleaded guilty to all the charges leveled against him, he received a summary trial, which took place on 9 October 2014 at the Sør-Trøndelag District Court in Trondheim. Northug was sentenced to 50 days of prison, ten days less than requested by the prosecutor. He had already served two days of the sentence in police custody after his initial arrest. In addition to the prison time, Northug was fined  and lost his driver's license [indefinitely, or at least] for five years. The prison sentence was served, while wearing an ankle monitor, in his home.

As a result of the crash, Audi decided not to renew their sponsorship agreement with Northug. Audi had been a sponsor of Northug since June 2011.

2020
On 13 August 2020, in Ullensaker, Northug was caught going  on a  road in his Jaguar F-Type SVR. Police did not confiscate the 40,000 Norwegian kroner found in Northug's car, however police proceeded to search his home and found around 10 grams of substance containing cocaine.

A later indictment in 2020 charged him with reckless driving at high speed, illegal possession (in his home) of 6 grams cocaine, 0.6 grams of MDMA, three tablets containing Diazepam and two tablets containing Alprazolam; and [holding or] using a mobile phone while driving. He pleaded guilty (before trial) on all counts; in a summary trial on 21 December 2020 he testified via videolink, at Oslo District Court, he was sentenced to seven months in prison and his driving license was revoked [indefinitely, or] at least for five years. The proceedings in court, revealed that Northug had been driving over 200 km/h on several occasions—two of them in an 80 km/h zone. The verdict said that while he was speeding, he made four video recordings—over several days— for a total of 12 minutes, while commenting about his own driving, as if the drivers being passed were being humiliated and put in their place."

As of June 2021, he was enrolled [as a client] at a clinic that deals with drug dependency; there he was serving his seven-month prison sentence, according to media. During the summer of 2021, he was released.

Cross-country skiing results
All results are sourced from the International Ski Federation (FIS).

Olympic Games
 4 medals – (2 gold, 1 silver, 1 bronze)

World Championships
 16 medals – (13 gold, 3 silver)

World Cup

Season titles
 3 titles – (2 overall, 1 distance)

Individual podiums
 38 victories – (20 , 18 )
 84 podiums – (40 , 44 )

Team podiums
 9 victories – (9 )
 12 podiums – (12 )

References

External links

  
Jan Petter Saltvedt. 12 November 2020. "«En stor PR-seier for Northug»" [«a huge victory regarding the public relations of Northug]. NRK

1986 births
Cross-country skiers at the 2010 Winter Olympics
Cross-country skiers at the 2014 Winter Olympics
Holmenkollen Ski Festival winners
Living people
Norwegian male cross-country skiers
Olympic cross-country skiers of Norway
Olympic bronze medalists for Norway
Olympic gold medalists for Norway
Olympic silver medalists for Norway
People from Mosvik
Olympic medalists in cross-country skiing
FIS Nordic World Ski Championships medalists in cross-country skiing
FIS Cross-Country World Cup champions
Medalists at the 2010 Winter Olympics
People convicted of making false statements
Tour de Ski winners
Tour de Ski skiers
Sportspeople from Trøndelag